Golgin A8 family member A is a protein that in humans is encoded by the GOLGA8A gene.

Function

The Golgi apparatus, which participates in glycosylation and transport of proteins and lipids in the secretory pathway, consists of a series of stacked, flattened membrane sacs referred to as cisternae. Interactions between the Golgi and microtubules are thought to be important for the reorganization of the Golgi after it fragments during mitosis. The golgins constitute a family of proteins which are localized to the Golgi. This gene encodes a golgin which structurally resembles its family member GOLGA2, suggesting that they may share a similar function. There are many similar copies of this gene on chromosome 15. Alternative splicing results in multiple transcript variants.

References

Further reading